Milan-Inter HC was an ice hockey team in Milan, Italy. The club was formed in 1956 by the merger of Hockey Club Milano Inter and HC Diavoli Rossoneri Milano.

They competed in the Serie A in the 1956-57 and 1957-58 seasons, winning the championship in 1958. The club became Diavoli HC Milano in 1958.

Achievements
Serie A champion (1): 1958.

References

Defunct ice hockey teams in Italy
Sport in Milan
1956 establishments in Italy
Ice hockey clubs established in 1956
Ice hockey clubs disestablished in 1958
1958 disestablishments in Italy